Children of the River is a young adult novel by Linda Crew published in 1989. It follows the story of a young girl who moves to a town to escape from the war in Cambodia. She then finds herself talking to an American White boy Jonathan McKinnon, which is forbidden in her culture.

Synopsis
Sundara Sovann is a 12 year old Cambodian girl growing up in Phnom Penh, the Cambodian capital. Sundara's childhood includes a boy named Chamroeun, described as charming and a smart boy. Chamroeun and Sundara's parents joke that they will one day be married. Sundara falls in love with Chamroeun, but Chamroeun goes to fight in the war as a soldier, right before Sundara leaves to go to her uncle and aunt's house. When Sundara is at her aunt and uncle's house she flees from Cambodia with her aunt, Soka, her grandma, and her uncle, Naro, to escape from  Khmer Rouge. She leaves her family behind in Cambodia, which she regrets later in the novel. Sundara's aunt Soka just had a baby, right before they had to leave. While on the small, very cramped ship, Sundara is put in charge of the infant, as Soka is drifting in and out of awareness. The baby is extremely malnourished, and Sundara, eager to save her cousin, asks a mother for her breast milk to help the baby get better. The mother states, "I would, but... Oh, this is all so terrible. I'm not getting enough to drink myself. Soon I'm afraid I won't have milk for my own.". She then goes to a helper and asks for some extra milk, or supplies. He gives her a hard time, but eventually gives her some powdered milk, and some sugar water in a bottle. Then the baby soon dies shortly after, devastating Sundara.

Sundara eventually makes it to America. She seems to understand American ways, but not the reasons behind them. To Sundara's dismay, a teacher, Mrs. Cathcart, reads her poem assignment aloud to the class. It is about her having to leave Cambodia, and all the people dying there. Sundara, along with Soka, work for Mr. Bonner, a farmer. Sundara also works Mr. Bonner's fruit stand at the market. There, she meets Jonathan, a boy her age, who attends the same school and seems very sweet to Sundara. Sundara also cannot help herself from admiring him. Soon he befriends her, asking to interview her about her life in Cambodia. Sundara is shy about her family history; having trouble opening up to him. Sundara and Jonathan soon fall for each other. Sundara's Aunt Soka has trouble accepting her crush. In fact, as soon as Soka knows of it, she makes Sundara promise that she will not talk to Jonathan anymore. Sundara soon finds out Chamroeun has been killed. She almost breaks down, but Jonathan comforts her. When he asks her why she didn't cry, she explains that she hasn't been able to cry since she left Cambodia.

As Sundara starts to adapt to American ways, she learns that her new friend Jonathan is popular at school. Jonathan's girlfriend, Cathy Gates, says nobody really seems to understand Jonathan but Cathy. According to Cathy, "Jonathan and I have been going together since the ninth grade. We have something very special between us." As Sundara and Jonathan's relationship builds, they start eating lunch together, and he then asks her to the movies. Sundara realizes she is becoming more American after being told, "You know, you ought to watch you become American.".

Sundara and her friend Moni have dinner. They end up reminded, that in their society back home all marriages are arranged. On top of Sundara having this problem, news is spreading through the school about her and Jonathan. Cathy soon finds out about their [friendship], and she is not happy. Cathy stands up for herself and decides to face Sundara; Sundara does not seem to want to face Cathy.

Sundara has trouble understanding Jonathan's relationship with Cathy. She finds herself confused about a lot of things, such as girls showering together after gym class. It is clear that Sundara has feelings for Jonathan, but cannot show him. Later, one night after a football game, her cousin Ravy gets home to tell Sundara that Jonathan got hurt while playing. Sundara becomes worried and goes to see him. In the hospital, Jonathan explains to Sundara how he dislikes Cathy's attention. He wishes that she had not sent him balloons. "I knew it," he says. "Cathy. I wish she wouldn't do stuff like this." He also admits to Sundara that he loves her.

Sundara is not able to get her mind off Jonathan. She is also told that Jonathan is quitting the football team, due to what Sundara has told him about Cambodia. Cathy is upset and knows something is going on between Jonathan and Sundara. She realizes Jonathan likes Sundara. Everything changes when Jonathan's father goes on a mission trip, solely because Jonathan yelled at his dad for not following through to help. Jonathan is ashamed that he yelled at his father, and wishes he hadn't. It seems to get harder to see each other after that. When Moni, her friend from Cambodia takes a trip with her to collect bottles,  Sundara notices a broken doll. The doll reminds her of her aunt's dead baby, making her collapse into hysterics. Sobbing, Sundara is dragged home by Moni and taken inside. After Grandmother claims the baby girl's spirit has taken over Sundara, the women all pray for a release on Sundara.

Characters 
Sundara: A teenager from Cambodia, who has just started a new life in America. Learning how to fit in, she quickly finds her place and meets new people and learns  lessons of their way.
Jonathan: Sundara's friend, though he constantly teases and flirts with her. He is very caring and gentle towards her. He tells Sundara that he loves her.
Tep Naro: Married to Soka, Sundara's aunt. He takes care of Sundara and loves her, and is more open to change than Soka. 
Mrs. Cathcart: Sundara's teacher. She reads a poem that Sundara wrote out loud to the class.
Jonathan's Parents: Very accepting of Sundara. They are curious about her life back in Cambodia.
Cathy: Jonathan's girlfriend. She is very popular and seems to dislike Sundara, but furthermore dislikes Jonathan and Sundara's relationship.
Kem Soka: Naro's wife and Sundara's strict aunt, is stuck on her Khmer ways. She seems to care more about who Sundara marries than how she really feels. Soka is also said to think of Sundara as a responsibility and not as family.
Ravy: Sundara's younger cousin who loves the American ways. He is very involved in her life.
Pon: Ravy's younger brother who is very similar to Ravy, but a bit more quiet.
Grandmother: Sundara's grandmother is very strict about the way Cambodia was and the beliefs she holds dear.
Kelly: When Sundara moves to America, Kelly becomes one of her close friends, and is somewhat like Moni.
Moni: A friend of Sundara who came to America from Cambodia after Sundara arrived there. She understands Cambodian ways and how Sundara is feeling.
Pok Simo: A Chinese boy that Soka is thinking would be a good husband for Sundara. Sundara hates him.
Mr.Bonner: A field owner that employees Sundara and her family.
Chamroeun: A Cambodian boy who was arranged to marry Sundara. Sundara loved him.
Valinn: Soka's sister
Chan Seng: Moni's boyfriend. 
Coach Hackenbruck: Jonathan's football coach
Jaypee Gloria: Friend of Jonathan
Kobe Gutierrez: Friend of Sundara
Cristian Carolino: Friend of Chamroeun

Writing 

Linda Crew researched Cambodia before writing the book to include more accurate information about the culture: "I knew nothing about the history and culture of Cambodia, so I spent a year in research before I ever started writing the first rough draft of the book."

Major themes
Children of the River has been praised for its ability to help young readers understand international affairs. It addresses "cultural leaps that a refugee must attempt." One reviewer remarked that "this novel has helped young adults understand the experience of Cambodian refugees settling in the United States after the Vietnam conflict."

Another theme that is portrayed throughout the novel is the "basic goodness of humankind which triumphs in some way even under the most inhumane circumstances."

Awards 

American Library Association Best Book for Young Adults
Golden Kite Honor Book from the Society of Children's Book Writers and Illustrators
International Reading Association Children's Book Award

See also 
Young adult literature

References 

1989 American novels
American children's novels
Novels set in Oregon
1989 children's books
Novels about immigration to the United States